Diego Armando Godoy Vázquez (born 1 April 1992) is a Paraguayan professional footballer who plays as a midfielder for Millonarios.

Career
Godoy's career started with Paraguayan Primera División side Cerro Porteño in 2010. He remained with the team for five years whilst making 27 appearances and scoring 2 goals, but most of his time with Cerro Porteño was spent out on loan. Firstly, Godoy joined Rubio Ñu and went on to play 19 times and score once. Loans to Sportivo Luqueño and Sportivo Carapeguá followed before a final one to Deportivo Capiatá, after 41 league appearances with those three aforementioned sides he left parent club Cerro Porteño to join his first loan team, Rubio Ñu, in 2015.

His permanent debut for Rubio Ñu came on 30 January in a 3–1 defeat against Sol de América. In his first full season with the team, 2016, Godoy scored 8 goals in 20 appearances including a brace versus Nacional. On 21 July 2016, Godoy joined Argentine Primera División side Unión Santa Fe on loan. He returned to Rubio Ñu at the end of 2016–17, he made nineteen appearances and scored four times in total for Unión. In January 2018, Godoy signed for General Díaz. Two years later, Godoy headed to Colombia with Millonarios. He made his bow on 31 January 2020 against Cúcuta Deportivo.

Career statistics
.

Honours
Cerro Porteño
Paraguayan Primera División: 2013 Clausura

References

External links

1992 births
Living people
Sportspeople from Asunción
Paraguayan footballers
Association football midfielders
Paraguayan expatriate footballers
Expatriate footballers in Argentina
Expatriate footballers in Colombia
Paraguayan expatriate sportspeople in Colombia
Paraguayan Primera División players
Argentine Primera División players
Categoría Primera A players
Cerro Porteño players
Club Rubio Ñu footballers
Sportivo Luqueño players
Sportivo Carapeguá footballers
Deportivo Capiatá players
Unión de Santa Fe footballers
General Díaz footballers
Millonarios F.C. players